Sadegh Goudarzi (born 22 September 1987 in Malayer) is an Iranian wrestler. Goudarzi won the silver medal in the 74 kg Freestyle competition at the 2012 Summer Olympics.

References

 Profile at FILA Wrestling Database

1987 births
Living people
Iranian male sport wrestlers
Asian Games gold medalists for Iran
Olympic wrestlers of Iran
Wrestlers at the 2012 Summer Olympics
Olympic silver medalists for Iran
Olympic medalists in wrestling
Asian Games medalists in wrestling
Wrestlers at the 2010 Asian Games
Medalists at the 2012 Summer Olympics
World Wrestling Championships medalists
Medalists at the 2010 Asian Games
Asian Wrestling Championships medalists
20th-century Iranian people
21st-century Iranian people